John Sands may refer to:

 John Sands (printer) (1818–1873)
John Sands (company), founded by the above
 John Sands (journalist) (1826–1900)
 John Sands (footballer) (1859–1924)

See also
 John Sandys (disambiguation)